The Seven Wonders of the Waterways is a list of landmarks on the navigable waterways of the United Kingdom. The list was originally compiled in 1946 by Robert Aickman, co-founder of the Inland Waterways Association (IWA), at a time when the waterways network was largely derelict. Today, the Canal & River Trust—formerly British Waterways—has jurisdiction over (and responsibility for) all of the sites except for the Barton Swing Aqueduct, which is owned and operated by the Bridgewater Canal Company.

Background 
In 1946, the Inland Waterways Association was formed to campaign for the conservation of navigable waterways in the United Kingdom. Robert Aickman, one of the co-founders of the association, proposed the list in his book Know Your Waterways as a method of highlighting significant feats of engineering on the canal network, as well as bringing attention to those at risk of becoming derelict. At the time of the list's publication, six of the locations were navigable. The London Midland and Scottish Railway Company Act of 1944 formally closed the Llangollen Canal, although the Pontcysyllte Aqueduct remained in use as a water feeder for the wider Shropshire Union Canal network. Aickman successfully passed through the Standedge Tunnel in Yorkshire with L. T. C. Rolt in 1948, at a time when it was closed to all other traffic and awaiting restoration from its state of disrepair. The Caen Hill Locks in Wiltshire became derelict shortly after the list's publication, with the last boat passage before restoration occurring in 1948. The Anderton Boat Lift only became inoperational for a sixteen-year period beginning in the 1980s, and the Barton Swing Aqueduct, the Bingley Five Rise Locks, and the Burnley Embankment have always—except for general maintenance—been navigable.

List 

The original list comprises two aqueducts, two lock systems, one tunnel, one boat lift and one embankment. All but two of the sites date from around the Canal Mania period:

Additional wonders 
A number of other canal locations have been proposed to expand or amend the list. In 2002, British Waterways published an alternative list based on the results of a poll, which removed the Burnley Embankment and the Barton Swing Aqueduct. This list saw the first inclusion of a Scottish location, the Falkirk Wheel:

A list published by canal multimedia production company Videoactive proposed the "New Seven Wonders of the Waterways", replacing the Caen Hill Locks, Standedge Tunnel and Burnley Embankment and introducing the only non-navigable location:

In 2015, the Canal & River Trust ran a competition to establish the Lost Wonders of the Waterways World. The resultant list highlighted three locations where canal restoration schemes are planned or underway:

Notes

References 

Canals in the United Kingdom